Tricholepisma is a genus of primitive insects belonging to the family Lepismatidae.

Nomenclature
Most authors have historically treated the nomenclatural gender of Tricholepisma as feminine, but in 2018 the International Commission on Zoological Nomenclature issued a formal ruling (ICZN Opinion 2427) stating the gender of Lepisma (and all genera with that ending) is neuter, following ICZN Article 30, which resulted in changes to the spelling of several species.

References

Fauna Europaea

Lepismatidae
Zygentoma
Insect genera
Insects of Europe